Armatimonadota is a phylum of gram-negative bacteria.

History 
Armatimonadota was originally described solely on the basis of environmental 16S rRNA gene clone sequences, and was temporarily titled candidate phylum OP10. However, in 2011 a bacterial strain belonging to the phylum was isolated from an aquatic plant in Japan. The species was named Armatimonas rosea and was the first member of its phylum, genus, and species.

Members 
Armatimonas rosea, an aerobic chemoheterotrophic bacterium, strain YO-36T, was isolated from rhizoplane of an aquatic plant (a reed, Phragmites australis) inhabiting a freshwater lake in Japan.

Chthonomonas calidirosea, an aerobic, saccharolytic, obligately thermophilic, motile, non-spore-forming bacterium, strain T49(T), was isolated from geothermally heated soil at Hell's Gate, Tikitere, New Zealand.

Phylogeny

Taxonomy
The currently accepted taxonomy is based on the List of Prokaryotic names with Standing in Nomenclature (LPSN) and National Center for Biotechnology Information (NCBI).

 Genus "Candidatus Nitrosymbiomonas" Okubo et al. 2021
 Species ?"Ca. Nitrosymbiomonas proteolyticus" Okubo et al. 2021
 Class Chthonomonadetes Lee et al. 2011 ["Chthonomonadia" Oren, Parte & Garrity 2016]
 Order Chthonomonadales Lee et al. 2011
 Family Chthonomonadaceae Lee et al. 2011
 Genus Chthonomonas Lee et al. 2011
 Species Chthonomonas calidirosea Lee et al. 2011
 Class Fimbriimonadia Im et al. 2012
 Order Fimbriimonadales Im et al. 2012
 Family Fimbriimonadaceae Im et al. 2012
 Genus Fimbriimonas Im et al. 2012
 Species Fimbriimonas ginsengisoli Im et al. 2012
 Class Armatimonadia Tamaki et al. 2011
 Order Armatimonadales Tamaki et al. 2011
 Family Armatimonadaceae Tamaki et al. 2011
 Genus Armatimonas Tamaki et al. 2011
 Species Armatimonas rosea Tamaki et al. 2011
 Order Capsulimonadales Li, Kudo & Tonouchi 2018
 Family Capsulimonadaceae Li, Kudo & Tonouchi 2018
 Genus Capsulimonas Li, Kudo & Tonouchi 2018
 Species Capsulimonas corticalis Li, Kudo & Tonouchi 2018

Notes

References

External links
Page for Armatimonadetes on LPSN

Bacteria phyla